The Mauritian Social Democratic Party (PMSD), also known as the Mauritian Conservative Party, is a political party in Mauritius. It is conservative and Francophilic. It is the fourth biggest political party in the National Assembly and forms part of Opposition.

History
Jules Koenig is regarded as the founder of the party which was known as Union Mauricienne from 1946 to 1956 before being re-branded to Ralliement Mauricien prior to the 1953 Legislative Council Elections. Koenig changed the party's name to Parti Mauricien after its defeat at the 1953 elections. Gaëtan Duval further modified the party's name to Parti Mauricien Social Démocrate (PMSD) after he succeeded to Jules Koenig as the party's leader. With its origins dating back to 1946 it is one of the oldest surviving parties in the country. Sir Gaetan Duval led the party from 1967 to 1995. The PMSD is known as the only significant political party which was not in favour of Mauritius Independence from Great Britain. It started out with a large following in the minority communities (Creoles, Chinese and Whites) and some Muslims.

Popularity and new leadership
However with the advent of the newly formed Mauritian Militant Movement (MMM) in the 1970s, PMSD started to lose popularity. It won 23 seats in the pre-Independence 1967 general elections; at the 1976 elections, it retained only 7 (plus an eighth indirectly elected member). Despite this apparent shrinkage in its base the PMSD managed to form part of ruling government from 1976 to 1982 after contracting an alliance with the Labour Party after the 1976 elections.

Soon after the 1968 Independence there was disagreement within the PMSD, which formed part of most of the Opposition in Parliament, regarding the growing rapprochement between the PMSD leader Sir Gaëtan Duval and the Labour leader Sir Seewoosagur Ramgoolam. As a result in 1969 a splinter group was formed within PMSD and it was led by Maurice Lesage and Guy Ollivry who had been prominent figures of the PMSD. As a result Maurice Lesage, Guy Ollivry, Raymond Rivet, Cyril Leckning, Clément Roussety and others left PMSD and created their own party Union Démocratique Mauricienne (UDM) which remained active for a number of years thereafter.

In the 1990s Gaëtan Duval left PMSD and formed his own splinter party called Parti Gaëtan Duval. In 1999 Xavier-Luc Duval also left PMSD to form his new party Parti Mauricien Xavier Duval.

In 2000 the PMSD formed part of the historical MSM/MMM alliance as a minority party. It joined the Labour Party-led Social Alliance, which included other allies.

In 2009 the PMSD merged with the Parti Mauricien Xavier Duval (PMXD) and retained its old name "PMSD". However Xavier Luc Duval became leader and Maurice Allet became president of the party. The PMSD renewed its focus on the Mauritian Creole community and remained a close ally of the Mauritian Labour Party.

In the lead up to elections of 2014, however, the PMSD joined the Alliance Lepep, a coalition comprising the Militant Socialist Movement, the Muvman Liberater, and itself. It won 11 seats.

Leading to the November 2019 elections the PMSD joined forces with its historical ally Labour Party to form an alliance called "Alliance Nationale". This alliance secured 14 seats in the Parliament.

References

Political parties in Mauritius
Conservative parties in Africa
Right-wing parties